Pandor is a surname. Notable people with this surname include:

 Danesh Pandor, actor who starred in Agent Raghav – Crime Branch
 Dominique Pandor (born 1993), Martiniquais footballer
 Miriam Pandor (1924-2016), German dancer and choreographer
 Naledi Pandor (born 1953), South African academic and politician
 Solly Pandor (1957/58-2016), Zambian football manager